"Mother, Here's Your Boy!" is a World War I song written and composed by Sidney D. Mitchell, Archie Gottler, and Theodore Morse. This song was published in 1918 by Leo. Feist, Inc., in New York, NY.
The sheet music cover depicts Uncle Sam presenting a returning soldier to his mother with the Statue of Liberty and ships in the background.

The sheet music can be found at the Pritzker Military Museum & Library.

References

Bibliography 
Music trades. January 1919. Englewood, N.J., etc.: Music Trades Corp.
Parker, Bernard S. World War I Sheet Music 1. Jefferson: McFarland & Company, Inc., 2007. . 
The Saturday evening post. Vol. 191. Philadelphia: G. Graham.
Vogel, Frederick G. World War I Songs: A History and Dictionary of Popular American Patriotic Tunes, with Over 300 Complete Lyrics. Jefferson: McFarland & Company, Inc., 1995. . 

Songs about mothers
Songs about soldiers
1918 songs
Songs of World War I
Songs with music by Theodore F. Morse
Songs written by Archie Gottler
Songs with lyrics by Sidney D. Mitchell